Juhan Piirimaa (born Johannes Preimuth; 9 February 1898 Püssi Parish (now Lüganuse Parish), Kreis Wierland –  1942) was an Estonian politician. He was a member of the VI Riigikogu (its Chamber of Deputies). He disappeared following the Soviet invasion of Estonia. His widow, Hilda (née Vilms), was the younger sister Jüri Vilms, who was of the first Estonian Deputy Prime Minister of Estonia. She later escaped the Soviet re-occupation of Estonia in 1944 and married Avdy Andresson, a member of the Estonian government in exile.

References

1898 births
Year of death missing
People from Lüganuse Parish
People from Kreis Wierland
Patriotic League (Estonia) politicians
Members of the Estonian National Assembly
Members of the Riigivolikogu